Bringing up Jack is an American sitcom television series that aired from Saturday May 27 until Saturday June 24, 1995. It aired in the 8:30 pm timeslot during its short-run.

Premise
Jack Gallagher plays a sports radio host with a chaotic family life consisting of a pregnant wife and two stepkids.

Cast
Jack Gallagher as Jack McMahon
Harley Jane Kozak as Ellen McMahon
Kathryn Zaremba as Molly McMahon
Jeff Garlin as Artie
Matthew Lawrence as Ryan McMahon

Episodes

References

External links

 

1995 American television series debuts
1995 American television series endings
1990s American sitcoms
English-language television shows
American Broadcasting Company original programming
Television series by ABC Studios